Teichium or Teichion was a town in Aetolia Epictetus, on the borders of Locris, and one day's march from Crocyleium.

Its site is tentatively located near the modern Teichio.

References

Populated places in ancient Aetolia
Former populated places in Greece